Blue Tongue Entertainment Pty, Ltd. was an Australian video game developer founded in 1995. It was acquired by THQ on 17 November 2004, and remained an internal development studio of THQ until its closure in August 2011. In addition to THQ, Blue Tongue had worked with the publishers Hasbro Interactive and Vivendi Universal Games.

Blue Tongue originally provided web development services, and moved into video games in 1995 with their first release, AFL Finals Fever. It was released on 9 June 1996 and reached number 3 on the Australian software sales charts. Another game, Riding Star, was their first international release. It was ported to multiple platforms, including the PlayStation and the Game Boy. Blue Tongue developed the TOSHI game engine used internally for many of its projects.

In 2008, Blue Tongue finished de Blob, its first original game since Riding Star, for the Wii system. de Blob was met with critical acclaim from various gaming websites, including Official Nintendo Magazine, which awarded the game a rating of 92% and a Gold Award, and IGN.com, which awarded the game several Wii-specific awards in its 2008 video game awards, including Best Platform Game, Best Graphics Technology, and Best Use of Sound. In addition to the awards won, IGN also nominated de Blob for several other Wii-specific awards, including Best New IP, Best Original Score, Most Innovative Design, and Game of the Year.

In 2011, Blue Tongue was announced to be closed down under a restructuring and realignment plan by parent company, THQ.

Games

Cancelled 

 The Avengers
 WWE Brawl

References

External links 
 Interview with Nick Hagger, Creative director at Blue Tongue

THQ
Defunct video game companies of Australia
Video game companies established in 1995
Video game companies disestablished in 2011
Video game development companies
Companies based in Melbourne
Australian companies established in 1995
Australian companies disestablished in 2011